Gayevo is a rural locality in Rusanovsky Selsoviet Rural Settlement, Fatezhsky District, Kursk Oblast, Russia. Population:

Geography 
The village is located on the Reut River (a left tributary of the Zhelen in the basin of the Svapa), 98 km from the Russia–Ukraine border, 56 km north-west of Kursk, 10.5 km north-west of the district center – the town Fatezh, 10 km from the selsoviet center – Basovka.

 Climate
Gayevo has a warm-summer humid continental climate (Dfb in the Köppen climate classification).

Transport 
Gayevo is located 7 km from the federal route  Crimea Highway as part of the European route E105, 5 km from the road of regional importance  (Fatezh – Dmitriyev), on the road of intermunicipal significance  (38K-038 – Nizhny Reut – Putchino), 23 km from the nearest railway halt 34 km (railway line Arbuzovo – Luzhki-Orlovskiye).

The rural locality is situated 58 km from Kursk Vostochny Airport, 177 km from Belgorod International Airport and 242 km from Voronezh Peter the Great Airport.

References

Notes

Sources

Rural localities in Fatezhsky District